Trial By Fire is a 2023 Indian Hindi-language crime drama web series written by Prashant Nair, Kevin Luperchio and directed by Prashant Nair and Randeep Jha. It stars Abhay Deol, Ashish Vidyarthi, Anupam Kher, Rajshri Deshpande, Rajesh Tailang,  Ratna Pathak, Shilpa Shukla, Shardul Bharadwaj and others. The web series is based on the book Trial by Fire: The Tragic Tale of the Uphaar Fire Tragedy authored by Neelam Krishnamoorthy and Shekhar Krishnamoorthy.

Cast 
 Abhay Deol as Shekhar Krishnamoorthy
 Rajshri Deshpande as Neelam Krishnamoorthy
 Abhishek Sharrma as Ujjwal (Shekhar and Neelam's son)
 Ashish Vidyarthi as Neeraj Suri
 Anupam Kher as Captain Hardeep Bedi
 Ratna Pathak Shah as Mrs. Bedi
 Atul Kumar as Mahesh Karve
 Ivan Rodrigues as Abhishek
 Sidharth Bhardwaj as Mr. Arora
 Shilpa Shukla as Shalini
 Rajesh Tailang as Veer Singh
 Nimisha Nair as Amrita Singh
 T. M. Karthik as Minister
 Punit Tiwari as Veer Singh's Son-in-Law
 Shardul Bharadwaj as Umesh
 Akanksha Vishwakarma as female AVUT member
 Chetan Sharma as Chirag
 Jaspal Sharma as Hari
 Abhinav Jha as Rupesh
 Kiran Sharma as Sarla

Episodes

Reception 
Shubhra Gupta of The Indian Express expressed that she was in the same theatre for the 12 o clock show, just three hours before the incident but moved to another theatre, and after reaching home she got the information about the incident. She wrote "Gopal and Sushil Ansal may still be the biggest names in the construction business, the charges against them may have been drastically reduced, they may have escaped serving their long sentence, but there is no missing the fact that they were brought to book. It was also their trial by fire, made a reality by Neelam and Shekhar, who have managed to start some ‘badlaav’, as opposed to ‘badla’, even though their fight for justice is far from over."

Saibal Chatterjee of NDTV rated 4 out 5 stars and wrote "The script adopts a consistently solemn tone to convey the magnitude of the Krishnamoorthy's loss and sorrow. The impact is enhanced manifold by a performance of stupendous power from Rajshri Deshpande as Neelam, who has been at the forefront of the campaign to prevent the misuse of power and pelf to escape culpability."

Deepa Gahlot for Scroll.in wrote "The show also captures the poignancy of small moments – Neelam suddenly noticing that her kids’ toothbrushes are still by the basin in the bathroom; a birthday cake being shoved into the arms of Shekhar; the stoic-looking Neelam exploding because she heard Shekhar humming."

Abhishek Srivastava of The Times of India praised Abhay Deol and Rajashri Deshpande's performance and wrote "The series' heart and soul, Rajshri Deshpande as Neelam Krishnamoorthy, delivers a gripping performance that will resonate for a very long time. She belts out a standout performance as a grieving mother who is driven to seek justice. She continues to take the lead, while her husband Shekhar, played by Abhay Deol, offers wonderful support."

Utkarsh Mishra for Rediff.com rated the web series 3 out of 5 stars and wrote "The series seems to show that the Ansals were single-handedly responsible for the tragedy (no wonder they went to court seeking an injunction against its release). Other perpetrators, or 'villains' as the series calls them, get their comeuppance, or reach a point of regret."

Kartik Bhardwaj of The New Indian Express wrote "Abhay Deol finally gets a role deserving of his acting capabilities. His Shekhar, emanates hopelessness and despondency in subtle actions, like brushing his teeth or standing in a beeline at a government office. His zeal to fight for justice is fading out as the years pass and he is becoming someone just yearning for an escape."

Mike McCahill of Variety wrote "“Trial by Fire” becomes vastly more kaleidoscopic than the linear procedural form typically allows. Nair and Luperchio dig out involving subplots for the Ansals’ enforcer Neeraj (Ashish Vidyarthi) and repairman Veer Singh (Rajesh Tailang), while a haunting, deftly acted sidebar centred on a retired Army couple (Anupam Kher and Ratna Pathak Shah) allows the show to re-examine both the veracity of the film people were literally dying to see, and what India was prepared to stand and fight for circa 1997."

Shubham Kulkarni of Koimoi rated the series 3.5/5 and wrote "Trial By Fire is difficult to watch if you are sensitive but a very important conversation. Do not give this a miss because it isn’t just a show."

Santanu Das of Hindustan Times in his review stated "Trial by Fire is an urgent and important work that urges the viewers to sit up and take notice of a decades-old tragedy that has been passed from one verdict to another. Rather than bridging the trials and calculations of a court-room investigation thriller, this is a controlled, heartbreaking drama that looks back in order to ask what has changed."

Prasing the performance of Rajshri Deshpande, Anuj Kumar of The Hindu in his review stated "Delivering a flawless performance that will remain etched in memory for years, Rajshri Deshpande makes us forget that we are watching a dramatic adaptation of true events, and Abhay Deol plays a perfect foil as the sedate Shekhar."

The series currently holds a 100% Rotten Tomatoes rating.

References

External links 
 
 

Indian web series
2023 Indian television seasons
Netflix original television series episodes